Romagny may refer to the following places in France:

 Romagny, Manche, a commune in the Manche department
 Romagny, Haut-Rhin, a commune in the Haut-Rhin department